Margaret of Sicily (also called Margaret of Hohenstaufen or Margaret of Germany) (1 December 1241, in Foggia – 8 August 1270, in Frankfurt-am-Main) was a Princess of Sicily and Germany, and a member of the House of Hohenstaufen. By marriage she was Landgravine of Thuringia and Countess Palatine of Saxony (German: Landgräfin von Thüringen und Pfalzgräfin von Sachsen).

She was the daughter of Frederick II, Holy Roman Emperor, King of Sicily and Germany, by his third wife, Isabella of England.  Her paternal grandparents were Henry VI, Holy Roman Emperor and Constance of Sicily. Her maternal grandparents were John of England and Isabella of Angoulême.

Birth
The date of her birth is difficult to ascertain because there is controversy over the exact number of children borne by her mother. Some sources say that she was the first or second child, born by the end of 1237; others say that she was the last child, born in December 1241, when Isabella died in childbirth. Historians commonly accept the latter date.

Life
Shortly after her birth (1242), Margaret was betrothed to Albert "the Degenerate", eldest son and heir of Henry III "the Illustrious", Margrave of Meissen. The marriage took place in June 1255, the bride receiving Pleissnerland (the towns of Altenburg, Zwickau, Chemnitz and Leisnig) as her dowry.

The couple settled at his residence in Eckartsberga and later moved to Wartburg, where she bore five children: three sons (Henry, Frederick and Dietzmann) and two daughters (Margaret and Agnes). Through her second son Frederick – later Margrave of Meissen – Margaret was the direct ancestor of the Electors and Kings of Saxony and English Queen consorts Margaret of Anjou and Anne of Cleves.

In 1265 her husband received the titles of Landgrave of Thuringia and Count Palatine of Saxony after the abdication of his father, who retained control of Meissen.

After the execution of her nephew Conradin (29 October 1268), Margaret, as the next legitimate relative, became the rightful Queen of Sicily and the general heiress of the Hohenstaufen claims over the Duchy of Swabia and the Kingdom of Jerusalem (despite the fact she was not descended from the Kings of Jerusalem, her father Frederick II had claimed the kingdom for himself). Her son Frederick assumed by some time this titles on her right.

After discovering the adultery of her husband with Kunigunde of Eisenberg, Margaret left Wartburg; according to a legend, before her departure she bit her son Frederick in the cheek; he was called henceforth Frederick the Bitten (de: Friedrich der Gebissene). The flight took place on 24 June 1270. Margaret went to Frankfurt-am-Main and was supported there by the citizens. She died there six weeks later.

Issue 
Margaret and Albert had five children:
 Henry (b. 21 March 1256 – d. 25 January/23 July? 1282), inherited the Pleissnerland in 1274.
Frederick (b. 1257 – d. Wartburg, 16 November 1323), Margrave of Meissen.
Theodoric, called Dietzmann (b. 1260 – murdered Leipzig, 10 December 1307), Margrave of Lusatia.
Margaret (b. 1262 – d. young, after 17 April 1273).
Agnes of Meissen (b. 1264 – d. September 1332), married before 21 July 1282 to Henry I, Duke of Brunswick-Grubenhagen.

References

1237 births
1270 deaths
Landgravines of Thuringia
Hohenstaufen
13th-century Italian women
14th-century German women
Royal consorts of Sicily
13th-century Sicilian people
Daughters of emperors
Children of Frederick II, Holy Roman Emperor
Daughters of kings